Gordon McLennan (12 May 1924 – 21 May 2011) was a Scottish political activist and draughtsperson who was General Secretary of the Communist Party of Great Britain (CPGB) from 1975 to 1990.

Background
Born in Glasgow, McLennan worked as an engineering draughtsperson before taking on various full-time posts within the CPGB. He contested the Glasgow Govan constituency at the 1959 general election, then the 1962 West Lothian by-election and Glasgow Govan again at the 1966 general election.

He became the National Organiser of the CPGB in 1966, and while holding this post, contested elections in St Pancras North at the 1970 and February 1974 general elections.

General Secretary
In 1975, McLennan was elected as General Secretary of the Communist Party of Great Britain. He held the post while the party was in terminal decline, with factional infighting within the CPGB, finally stepping down in 1989. One of his acts as General Secretary was to appoint Martin Jacques, then an academic at the University of Bristol, as editor of Marxism Today in 1977. After the dissolution of the party, in 1991, he joined the Communist Party of Scotland. He remained active in the pensioners' movement and supported the Respect – The Unity Coalition candidate George Galloway at the 2005 general election. He also maintained contact with the Alliance for Green Socialism, one of the successor bodies to the CPGB (via the Green Socialist Network), but although he addressed AGS meetings and wrote for the AGS journal (Green Socialist), he never joined this organisation.

Personal life and death
McLennan married his wife, Mary, in 1950, and they had four children. He died from cancer in London on 21 May 2011 at the age of 87. He was cremated at Golders Green Crematorium.

References

Sources

1924 births
2011 deaths
20th-century Scottish politicians
Communist Party of Great Britain members
Deaths from cancer in England
Leaders of political parties in the United Kingdom
Politicians from Glasgow
Scottish communists